Francesco Antonio Depace (1586–1655) was a Roman Catholic prelate who served as Bishop of Aquino (1646–1655).

Biography
Francesco Antonio Depace was born in 1586 in Polignano, Italy.
On 3 Dec 1646, he was appointed during the papacy of Pope Innocent X as Bishop of Aquino.
On 8 Dec 1646, he was consecrated bishop by Pier Luigi Carafa (seniore), Cardinal-Priest of Santi Silvestro e Martino ai Monti, with Ranuccio Scotti Douglas, Bishop of Borgo San Donnino, and Alessandro Vittrici, Bishop of Alatri, serving as co-consecrators. 
He served as Bishop of Aquino until his death in 1655.

References

External links and additional sources
 (for Chronology of Bishops) 
 (for Chronology of Bishops) 

17th-century Italian Roman Catholic bishops
Bishops appointed by Pope Innocent X
1586 births
1655 deaths